Edward Vivian Dearman Birchall  (10 August 1884 – 10 August 1916), was an English philanthropist who died of wounds at the Battle of the Somme. He left a legacy of £1000 for the promotion of voluntary services. The money was used to help create, in 1919, the National Council of Social Services. It later became the National Council for Voluntary Organisations, an umbrella body for charities in England.

Early life and education
He was born on 10 August 1884 at Bowden Hall, Upton St Leonards, Gloucestershire, the third, and youngest, son of Dearman and Emily Jowitt Birchall.

Birchall attended school in Sunningdale, Berkshire, from 1893 to 1898 and Eton College from 1898 to 1903. He graduated from Magdalen College, University of Oxford with a  BA in 1908.

Military service
Birchall was a captain in the 1/1st Buckinghamshire Battalion. He died on 10 August 1916 and is buried in France, at Étaples Military Cemetery near Boulogne.

Notes

References

1884 births
1916 deaths
19th-century British philanthropists
20th-century British philanthropists
Alumni of Magdalen College, Oxford
British Army personnel of World War I
British military personnel killed in the Battle of the Somme
Burials at Étaples Military Cemetery
English philanthropists
Military personnel from Gloucestershire
Oxfordshire and Buckinghamshire Light Infantry officers
People educated at Eton College
People from Stroud District